Andrés Armando Stagnaro, also known as Andrea Stagnaro (born November 19, 1907) was an Argentine professional football player. He also held Italian citizenship.

He played for 2 seasons (26 games, no goals) in the Serie A for A.S. Roma.

1907 births
Year of death missing
Argentine footballers
Argentina international footballers
Chacarita Juniors footballers
Racing Club de Avellaneda footballers
Club Atlético Atlanta footballers
Serie A players
A.S. Roma players
Association football defenders
Footballers from Buenos Aires